Rosters at the 2003 IIHF World Championship in Finland.

Canada

Sweden

Slovakia

Austria

Belarus

Czech Republic

Denmark

Finland

Germany

Japan

Latvia

United States

Russia

Slovenia

Switzerland

Ukraine

References
https://web.archive.org/web/20100308074814/http://hokej.snt.cz/index.html

http://quanthockey.com
Official site

rosters
IIHF World Championship rosters